Hans Tore Gunnar Dahllöf (born 25 January 1941) is a Swedish former ice hockey goaltender and Olympian.

Dahllöf played with Team Sweden at the 1968 Winter Olympics held in Grenoble, France. He previously played for the Brynäs IF in the Swedish Elite League.

References

1941 births
Living people
Ice hockey players at the 1968 Winter Olympics
Olympic ice hockey players of Sweden
Swedish ice hockey goaltenders
People from Gävle
Sportspeople from Gävleborg County